Chaophraya Bodindechanuchit, personal name Yaem na Nakhon (also spelled na Nagara) was the Siamese Minister of Defense from August 26, 1921 to August 4, 1926.

Biography

Early years
Yaem spent his childhood studying Thai and Khmer and Thai numbers under a few tutors. When he was 13, he ordained as a novice monk at Wat Phra Mahathat, Nakhon Si Thammarat province but later moved to Wat Mai Ka Kaew.

Military service
Yaem entered government service in 1880 after Somdet Chaophraya Sri Suriwongse recruited him while visiting Nakhon Si Thammarat and brought him to Bangkok. Yaem then served under  before becoming a cadet at the Royal Military Academy (now the Chulachomklao Royal Military Academy). He was the third student there, and studied at the Saranrom Palace until graduating, and was promoted to 2nd Lieutenant on December 1, 1889. On November 15, 1892, he was promoted to captain and on May 17, 1900, to Major. On December 5, 1897, he received the noble title of Luang Ruapratsapatphon, with a sakdina of 800. He was promoted to lieutenant colonel on May 14, 1902 and on September 20, 1901, he had the title of Phra Suradet Nachit and a sakdina of 1,000. 

Yaem was described to serve with honesty and his ability to succeed within the government ranks, eventually making him adjutant of the Army on August 6, 1903 along with a prior promotion on July 16, 1903 to a colonel. He also gained the title of Phraya Woradetsakdawut on November 12, 1903. In 1902, Yaem oversaw the establishment of the military in Monthon Phayap in the north to suppress the Ngiao rebellion there. Later, in 1912, he was named to the tribunal for the court martial of the instigators of the Palace Revolt of 1912. He was named a privy councillor of King Vajiravudh, and would also continue in the role under King Prajadhipok. He was promoted to Lieutenant General on April 11, 1912. He was made Permanent Secretary of the Ministry of Defense in 1910. When Vajiravudh introduced the use of surnames in 1912, he granted Yaem's family the surname of "na Nagara" as descendants of the Governor of Nakhon Si Thammarat on June 24, 1913.

He was then finally promoted to a full general on April 1, 1919. Later on, he became acting Minister of Defense on August 26, 1921 and was appointed as minister April 1, 1922. On November 11, 1922, he was given the title of Chaophraya Bodindechanuchit with a sakdina of 10,000. He was a member of Vajiravudh's paramilitary movement the Wild Tiger Corps, and received the rank of major on February 15, 1923.

Later years
Bodindechanuchit resigned from Minister of Defense on August 4, 1926 from illness and retired in Bangkok. During his later years, he would donate extensively to the maintenance for Buddhist temples in Bangkok as well as his hometown of Nakhon Si Thammarat. By this point, Bodindechanuchit had married Liap, daughter of Luang Sunthonsinthop (Cho Patchim) and had 4 children with her.

Awards
Ratana Varabhorn Order of Merit (1917)
Order of Chula Chom Klao, 1st Class (1922)
Order of the White Elephant, 1st Class (1913)
Order of the Crown of Thailand, 1st Class (1912)
Order of Rama, 2nd Class (1918)
 (1903)
King Vajiravudh's Royal Cypher Medal, 2nd Class (1921)
King Prajadhipok's Royal Cypher Medal, 3rd Class (1926)
King Bhumibol Adulyadej's Royal Cypher Medal, 2nd Class (1954)

Foreign Awards
: Legion of Honour, 2nd Class (Grand Officer, 1921)
: Order of Brunswick, 1st Class (Commanders Cross, 1909)

References

1867 births
1961 deaths
Ministers of Defence of Thailand
Chaophraya
19th-century Thai people
Grand Officiers of the Légion d'honneur
People from Nakhon Si Thammarat province
Royal Thai Army generals